Abdulmalik Dehamshe (born 4 March 1943) is an Israeli Arab former politician, who served as a member of the Knesset for the United Arab List between 1996 and 2006. He was also leader of the party.

Biography
Born in Kafr Kanna during the Mandate era, Dehamshe completed his secondary education in Nazareth and gained a BA from the Hebrew University of Jerusalem in 1968, and worked as a lawyer.

In 1996 he was elected to the Knesset on the Arab Democratic Party-United Arab List joint list. He was re-elected in 1999 and became a Deputy Speaker of the Knesset. The Or Commission found that he was responsible for inflaming violence during the October 2000 events.

In 1998, he commented "Any Arab who serves in the Israeli Army is a disgusting criminal. We reject all forms of military service because we are part of the Palestinian people." After an Israeli airstrike killed three Syrian soldiers, he sent a letter of condolences to Syrian President Bashar al-Assad, and wrote the return address as "Nazareth, Palestine".

He retained his seat again in the 2003 elections and remained a Deputy Speaker. He lost his seat in the 2006 elections. That same year, following the loss of his Knesset seat, he expressed his support for suicide bombings, the use of Qassam rockets on Israeli population centers, and kidnappings of Israelis by Palestinian militants.

References

External links

1943 births
Living people
20th-century Israeli lawyers
21st-century Israeli lawyers
Arab members of the Knesset
Arab people in Mandatory Palestine
Deputy Speakers of the Knesset
Hebrew University of Jerusalem alumni
Members of the 14th Knesset (1996–1999)
Members of the 15th Knesset (1999–2003)
Members of the 16th Knesset (2003–2006)
Palestinian nationalists
People from Northern District (Israel)
United Arab List leaders